Qaryat al-Qabil, often called simply al-Qaryah, is a village in Bani al-Harith District of Amanat al-Asimah Governorate, Yemen. It is the largest settlement in the Wadi Zahr area.

History 
The earliest known historical reference to Qaryat al-Qabil is in 1297 CE (696 AH). In 1545 (952 AH), it was described as a walled town, but it doesn't seem to have been a military center, and no traces of the walls remain today. Historically, it was overlooked by a fort called Hisn Ūd.

Nearby places 
Dar al-Hajar
Thaqban
ʽAlman
Dhahaban
Suq Bayt Naʽam

References 

Villages in Sanaa Governorate